Elisabeth Mikula (born 5 March 1951) is an Austrian former competitive figure skater. She competed at the 1968 Winter Olympics in Grenoble, placing 18th, and finished in the top ten at three ISU Championships – 1966 Europeans in Bratislava, Czechoslovakia; 1967 Europeans in Ljubljana, Yugoslavia; and 1969 Europeans in Garmisch-Partenkirchen, West Germany.

Competitive highlights

References 

1951 births
Austrian female single skaters
Figure skaters at the 1968 Winter Olympics
Living people
Olympic figure skaters of Austria
Figure skaters from Vienna
20th-century Austrian women